Ahimsa is a term meaning to do no harm.

Ahimsa may also refer to:
 Ahimsa in Jainism, a religious philosophy
 Ahinsa (1979 film), a 1979 Bollywood action film
 Ahimsa (1981 film), an Indian film in Malayalam
 Ahimsa (1987 film), a Sri Lankan film
 Ahimsa: Stop to Run, a 2005 Thai film
 Ahimsa, Cheltenham, the Marie Byles' house in Sydney, Australia
 "Ahimsa" (Supergirl), an episode of Supergirl